The 2013–14 season was Odense Boldklub's 126th season in existence. Odense BK has finished as 10th (lowest before relegation) the last two seasons.

Pre-season and friendlies
OB will precede their 2013–14 campaign with a local tour of 4 exhibition matches on Funen, including a training camp in Germany, with friendlies against VfL Bochum and Goslarer SC 08.

Squad

First team 

Last updated on 31 August 2013

Transfers and loans

Transfers in
First team

Reserves and youth team

Transfers out
First team

Reserves and youth team

Competitions

Danish Superliga

League table

Matches

Results summary

Result by match day

Squad statistics

Appearances and goals
Appearances and goals will appear once the season commences.
Last updated on 27 August 2013

Goalscorers
Includes all competitive matches. The list is sorted by shirt number when total goals are equal.
Last updated on 1 October 2013

Disciplinary record
Includes all competitive matches. The list is sorted by shirt number when total cards are equal.
Last updated on 1 October 2013

Notes

References 

Odense Boldklub season
Odense Boldklub seasons